Wanaty  is a village in the administrative district of Gmina Łaskarzew, within Garwolin County, Masovian Voivodeship, in east-central Poland.

During World War II units of Schutzpolizei and Sonderdienst, led by Kreishauptmann Karl Freudenthal "pacified" the village and brutally murdered 108 inhabitants.

References

Wanaty